Kuhmareh Rural District is a rural district (dehestan) in Kuhmareh District, Kuhchenar County, Fars Province, Iran. At the 2006 census, its population was 9,356, in 2,136 families.  The rural district has 13 villages.

References 

Rural Districts of Fars Province
Kazerun County